Sergey Gennadyevich Pryadkin (August 17, 1961, Astrakhan, RSFSR, USSR) is a Russian football functionary, vice president and member of the bureau of the executive committee of the Russian Football Union, president of the Russian Premier League, member of the Board of Directors of the European Professional Football Association leagues, member of the UEFA Professional Football Strategic Council, member of the UEFA Player Status and Agency Activities Committee. Acting President of the Russian Football Union (December 19, 2018 — February 21, 2019).

Former employee of the KGB, FAPSI, and  FSB of Russia, reserve colonel.

References

External links
 Пресс-портрет на Яндексе
 Сергей Прядкин: Надоело молчать

1961 births
Living people
People from Astrakhan
Russian football chairmen and investors
KGB officers
Presidents of the Russian Football Union